Webex by Cisco is an American company that develops and sells web conferencing, videoconferencing  and contact center as a service applications. It was founded as WebEx in 1995 and taken over by Cisco Systems in 2007. Its headquarters are in San Jose, California.

Its software products include Webex App, Webex Suite, Webex Meetings, Webex Messaging, Webex Calling, Webex Contact Center, and Webex Devices. All Webex products are part of the Cisco Systems collaboration portfolio.

History 
WebEx was founded in 1995 by Subrah Iyar and Min Zhu. It had its initial public offering in July 2000. WebEx was listed on the NASDAQ National Market, and then the NASDAQ Global Select Market, when that was introduced in 2006.

Services 

At the time of the acquisition, all Webex applications were built on the MediaTone platform and supported by the Webex MediaTone Network (originally called the Webex interactive network), a global network intended for use with on-demand programs. The network was designed by Shaun Bryant, Webex's Chief Network Architect, and Zaid Ali Sr, Network Architect, to be one of the first SaaS platforms on the Internet.

In July 2006, AOL and Webex launched a business version of AOL's instant messaging software, AIM Pro, with additional features to help workers collaborate using conferencing tools offered by Webex.

On September 26, 2006, the company announced plans to offer a web collaboration "mashup" platform called "Webex Connect".

On November 17, 2014, Cisco announced an evolution of Webex called Project Squared. On March 17, 2015 this effort was re-branded as Cisco Spark.

On April 18, 2018, Cisco announced that Cisco Spark would be combined into the Cisco Webex platform. On this same date, Cisco rebranded all of the rest of their Spark products to Webex, including the Spark Room Kit—now Webex Room Kit—and Spark Board—now Webex Board.

On May 15, 2020, during the COVID-19 pandemic, Cisco CFO Kelly Kramer reported in the month of April 2020, they had 500 million meeting attendees, and that equated to 25 billion meeting minutes, using its video-conferencing application Webex.

In September 2020, Cisco launched a new platform Webex Classrooms for virtual homeroom encounters.

On October 26, 2021, Cisco launched an update aimed to enhance virtual and hybrid in-person meetings and events, using AI-powered technology for their Webex portfolio.

Acquisition 
The company acquired Intranets.com in 2005, providing entrance into the small- and mid-size business market through the company's customer base of businesses with fewer than 100 employees. It acquired the ability to offer online collaboration tools such as discussion forums, document sharing and calendaring while Intranets.com provided access to the Webex communications environment for its customers.

On March 15, 2007, Cisco Systems announced it would acquire WebEx for $3.2 billion. Cisco has said that its long-term plan is to absorb WebEx at both a technology and a sales level.

In October 2020, Cisco acquired BabbleLabs.

In February 2021, Cisco acquired imimobile, a provider of communications platform as a service (CPaaS) solutions for its Webex  collaboration portfolio imimobile.

Legal proceedings and inquiries

Goldman Sachs securities fraud investigation 
As a result of a securities fraud investigation initiated by the SEC and by various state Attorney General offices, Goldman Sachs faced charges of issuing unfair research, including coverage of WebEx, and IPO violations for the period 1999 to 2001. Webex management allegedly dictated to Goldman Sachs analysts what the research should and should not include. Webex maintains the management's information was accurate. Another charge accuses Goldman Sachs of violating securities law in its allocation of shares in WebEx's initial public offering.

Raindance lawsuit for patent infringement 
On September 27, 2005, Webex sued Raindance Communications, Inc., a competitor, for patent infringement. On October 14, 2005, Raindance filed a countersuit against Webex for patent infringement. Both parties sought both damages and an injunction enjoining further acts they claim to be infringing on patents. On March 31, 2006, the parties agreed to the dismissal of both actions, releases of claims for past infringement, payments associated with those releases, and cross-licenses to each other's patents. The agreement resulted in Webex receiving 1 million dollars from Raindance.

See also 
 Collaborative software
 Comparison of web conferencing software
 Comparison of remote desktop software
 Zoom (software)

References

External links 
 

1995 establishments in California
1995 establishments in the United States
2007 mergers and acquisitions
American companies established in 1995
Cisco software
Cisco Systems acquisitions
Companies based in Santa Clara, California
Companies established in 1995
Internet properties established in 1995
Professional networks
Remote administration software
Software companies based in the San Francisco Bay Area
Software companies established in 1995
Software companies of the United States
Telecommunications companies established in 1995
Videotelephony
Web conferencing